Agenium is a genus of South American plants in the grass family.

 Species
 Agenium leptocladum (Hack.) Clayton -  Brazil (São Paulo, Santa Catarina, D.F., Goiás, Mato Grosso, Minas Gerais, Paraná), Argentina (Misiones, Corrientes), Paraguay, Bolivia (Santa Cruz)
 Agenium majus Pilg. - Brazil (Mato Grosso do Sul), Paraguay
 Agenium villosum (Nees) Pilg. - Brazil, Bolivia (Santa Cruz), Paraguay, Uruguay, Argentina

See also
 List of Poaceae genera

References

Andropogoneae
Poaceae genera
Grasses of South America
Taxa named by Christian Gottfried Daniel Nees von Esenbeck